Oluwafisayo Faruq Dele-Bashiru (born 6 February 2001) is an English professional footballer who plays for League One club Sheffield Wednesday, as a midfielder.

Career
After playing for the Manchester City youth team, whom he joined at the age of 8, he moved to Sheffield Wednesday in July 2020, signing for an undisclosed fee.

He made his senior debut on 5 September 2020, in the EFL Cup, starting the game away to Walsall and would make his first league appearance against Bristol City coming off the bench. In February 2021 he suffered an ankle injury after coming off the bench against Brentford, and it was expected that he would be out-of-action for four-to-six weeks.

He broke into the first team again during his second season, and in October 2021 he won the club's Player of the Month award, as well as scoring his first senior goal in a game against Cambridge United.

In September 2022 he was nominated for the EFL Cup Player of the Second Round, following a goal and assist against Rochdale, which he subsequently won.

Career statistics

Personal life
Born in Germany, Dele-Bashiru moved to England at a young age and is of Nigerian descent. His brother Tom Dele-Bashiru is also a footballer.

References

2001 births
Living people
Footballers from Hamburg
English footballers
German footballers
English sportspeople of Nigerian descent
German sportspeople of Nigerian descent
Manchester City F.C. players
Sheffield Wednesday F.C. players
Association football midfielders
Black British sportspeople
English Football League players